The Pygmephoridae are a family of mites, in the order Trombidiformes.

References 

Trombidiformes
Acari families